"Baby Come Home" is a 2012 song by British post-grunge band Bush from their fifth album The Sea of Memories. It was released as the third single on 17 January 2012.

Music video
The music video was directed by Gavin Rossdale's brother-in-law Todd Stefani. It is available on Bush's VEVO account.

Charts

Weekly charts

Year-end charts

References

2012 singles
Bush (British band) songs
Songs written by Gavin Rossdale
2012 songs
Song recordings produced by Bob Rock